Odostomia acutidens, common name the sharp-tooth odostome,  is a species of sea snail, a marine gastropod mollusc in the family Pyramidellidae, the pyrams and their allies.

Description
The shell grows to a length of  4 mm.

Distribution
This species occurs in the following locations:
 Gulf of Mexico (Florida)

References

External links
 To Biodiversity Heritage Library (13 publications)
 To Encyclopedia of Life
 To USNM Invertebrate Zoology Mollusca Collection
 To ITIS
 To World Register of Marine Species

acutidens
Gastropods described in 1884